Treasure Island (also known as Lovuka or Elovuka) is a small island within the Mamanuca Islands of Fiji in the South Pacific. The islands are a part of the Fiji's Western Division.

Geography
Lovuka is a low reef island. It's home to a private resort. Treasure Island is close to Nukasiga Sand Bar.

References

External links
Treasure Island Resort

Islands of Fiji
Mamanuca Islands